The de Havilland DH.87 Hornet Moth is a single-engined cabin biplane designed by the de Havilland Aircraft Company in 1934 as a potential replacement for its highly successful de Havilland Tiger Moth trainer.  Although its side-by-side two-seat cabin made it closer in configuration to the modern aircraft that military trainee pilots would later fly, there was no interest from the RAF and the aircraft was put into production for private buyers.

Design and development

The prototype first flew at Hatfield on 9 May 1934 and, with two other pre-production aircraft, embarked on an extensive test program that resulted in the first production aircraft (designated DH.87A) completed in August 1935 having wings of greater outboard taper. These were found to cause problems, especially when landing in three-point attitude: there was a tendency for the tips to stall, causing embarrassment to the pilot and often damage to the aeroplane. From early 1936, de Havilland offered owners of the DH.87A replacement wings of the new squarer shape at a reduced price in exchange for the original wings. Designated DH.87B, new aircraft from about manufacture Number 68 were built with the new square wings. The alterations slightly increased overall weight at some penalty to performance.

Production was 164 aircraft, of which 84 were placed on the British Register. Many were impressed for military service during World War II, mostly being used by the RAF as liaison aircraft.

Small numbers survived the war and with time became highly prized by vintage aircraft enthusiasts. A small number are still flying, over seventy years after production ceased.

Variants

  

 DH.87 Hornet Moth : prototypes
 DH.87A Hornet Moth : production model
 DH.87B Hornet Moth : production model with wing modification

Operators

Civil charter operators and pilots 1935–2009

 - TC-101

Military operators

Portuguese Air Force

South African Air Force

Royal Air Force (1940–1945)
No. 24 Squadron RAF
No. 49 Squadron RAF
No. 116 Squadron RAF
No. 510 Squadron RAF
No. 526 Squadron RAF
No. 527 Squadron RAF
No. 528 Squadron RAF
No. 529 Squadron RAF
Royal Navy Fleet Air Arm
One aircraft impressed and four from Canada

Specifications (DH.87B)

References

Notes

Bibliography

 Jackson, A.J. De Havilland Aircraft since 1909. London: Putnam, Third edition, 1987. .
 Follett, K. "Hornet flight", (translated in Italian "Il volo del calabrone", Mondadori Editore S.p.A., Milano, 2003 ) It's a fictitious novel, first printed in 2002, in which a hornet moth plays a key role in the story.

External links

The de Havilland Moth Club

1930s British civil utility aircraft
1930s British military utility aircraft
Hornet Moth
Single-engined tractor aircraft
Biplanes
Aircraft first flown in 1934